Kentisbeare is a village and civil parish in the Mid Devon district of Devon, England. Its nearest town is Cullompton.

Descent of the manor
In the 17th century the manor of Kentisbeare was owned by Sir John Wyndham (1558–1645) of Orchard Wyndham, Somerset. In 1810 it was owned by his descendant Hon. Percy Charles Wyndham (1757-1833), MP, 2nd son of Charles Wyndham, 2nd Earl of Egremont, who also owned the manor of Blackborough where in 1838 George Wyndham, 4th Earl of Egremont (d.1845) built a palatial villa, known as Blackborough House. The 4th Earl built Kentisbeare House in 1841, to the designs of J. T. Knowles, for his relative the rector of Kentisbeare.

Historic estates

Wood
The estate of Wood was held by the Whiting family between the reigns of King Edward III (1327-1377) and King Henry VIII (1509-1547). The last in the male line was John Whitinge (d.1529), a member of the Merchant Venturers, whose elaborately panelled chest tomb survives in Kentisbeare Church, in the chapel at the east end of the south aisle, which he built. The two monumental brasses which were originally affixed to the monument are now lost, but his armorials survive sculpted on the wooden screen. John Whiting left four daughters and co-heiresses:
Whiting daughter, married to a FitzJames.
Agnes Whiting, 2nd daughter, who married  Henry I Walrond (d.1550), of Bradfield, Uffculme. Wood passed to the Walrond family, and appears to have been used as a secondary residence and dower house as several members of the family were subsequently buried in Kentisbeare Church.
Whiting daughter married to an Ashford.
Whiting daughter married to a Keynes.
In 1810 Wood belonged to Samuel Southwood, Esq.

Betty Limpany
In 1799, Betty Limpany was executed in Exeter for burning down the house of her master, William Leech of Kentisbeare.

Further reading
Whiting, Richard, Whiting of Wood, a mediaeval landed family (Lords of the Manors of Wood, Payhambury, Pridhamsleigh, etc.) In Family History Tracts, vol. 91. (Typescript, Library of Society of Genealogists)  Copy deposited with the Devon Record Office.
Chalk, E S. The town, village, manors, and church of Kentisbeare. Transactions of the Devon Association, vol. 42 (1910) pp. 278-345

Sources
Vivian, Lt.Col. J.L., (Ed.) The Visitations of the County of Devon: Comprising the Heralds' Visitations of 1531, 1564 & 1620, Exeter, 1895, pp. 768–770, pedigree of Walrond
Risdon, Tristram (d.1640), Survey of Devon, 1810 edition, p. 89, Kentisbeare

References

Villages in Mid Devon District
Civil parishes in Devon
Former manors in Devon